Menlo Park is a city at the eastern edge of San Mateo County within the San Francisco Bay Area of California in the United States. It is bordered by San Francisco Bay on the north and east; East Palo Alto, Palo Alto, and Stanford to the south; and Atherton, North Fair Oaks, and Redwood City to the west. It is one of the most educated cities in  California and the United States; nearly 70% of residents over 25 have earned a bachelor's degree or higher. It had 33,780 residents at the 2020 United States Census. It is home to the corporate headquarters of Meta, and is where Google, Roblox Corporation and Round Table Pizza were founded.  Its train station holds the record as the oldest continually operating train station in California.

Toponym
"Menlo" is derived from Menlo (the anglicized spelling of Irish Gaelic 'Mionloch', meaning 'small lake') in County Galway, Ireland. The name "Menlo Park" was given to a ranch purchased by Irish settlers in honor of their home village in Ireland.

History

The area of Menlo Park was inhabited by the Ohlone people when the Portolá expedition arrived in 1769.

In 1795, the Rancho de las Pulgas Spanish land grant was made that included the area of the current city.

In 1851, two Irish immigrants, Dennis J. Oliver and his brother-in-law, D.C. McGlynn, purchased a  tract of land on the former Rancho de las Pulgas. In 1854, they erected a gate with a wooden arch bearing the inscription "Menlo Park" and the date "August 1854" at the entrance to their property (now the intersection of Middle Ave and El Camino Real). The word "Menlo" derived from the owners' former home of Menlo (or Menlough) in County Galway, Ireland, and is an anglicized version of the original Irish name of the place, Mionloch, meaning "middle lake".

In 1863, the San Francisco and San Jose Rail Road had built the railroad from San Francisco to as far as Mayfield (now California Avenue station in Palo Alto) and started running trains to the area. They named a nearby station "Menlo Park" after the sign. The 1867 station building still stands on the platform of the current Caltrain station, used by the local Chamber of Commerce. It holds the record as the oldest, continually operating train station in California. The town of Menlo Park grew up around this station, becoming a popular home for San Francisco businessmen. A post office was established in 1870, and the city was incorporated in 1874 (it dissolved after two years, but later was permanently incorporated in 1927). The original arch, which gave its name to the stations and ultimately, the city, survived until 1922, when it was destroyed in an automobile accident. The origin of the name of Menlo Park, California (circa 1850) antedates any work done by Thomas Edison (circa 1876) in Menlo Park, New Jersey; Menlo Park, New Jersey, was named after Menlo Park, California, as was Menlo, Washington.

In 1917–18, a large portion of Menlo Park was the site of Camp Fremont, a training camp for, at its height, 27,000 men being sent to fight in World War I. It did not last long (the camp was dismantled after the war), but army engineers paved the first streets in Menlo Park and laid the first water and gas lines. The army did retain the camp hospital, and it is now the site of a Veterans Administration Hospital off of Willow Road in Menlo Park. In the autumn of 1918, a flu pandemic hit Camp Fremont and killed 147.

At the start of World War II, the US government bought the  estate of Timothy Hopkins from his widow and created the Palo Alto General Hospital, later renamed the Dibble General Hospital (after Colonel John Dibble, who was killed in 1943). After the war ended, some of the land was sold to the city and became the sites of the main library and city hall. More of the land was bought by Stanford University to house the increase in students due to the G.I. Bill; the area was known as the "Stanford Village", which existed as student housing until the mid-1960s. This land also was the site of the Stanford Research Institute (now SRI International) starting in 1947; between 1955 and 1968, SRI bought the rest of the Stanford Village.

In the 1960s, the former  estate of Frederick W. Sharon (1859–1914) (son of Senator William Sharon) and his wife, Louise Tevis Breckinridge Sharon (1858–1938;  daughter of Lloyd Tevis and divorced wife of John Witherspoon Breckinridge), in the hills of south west Menlo Park was developed and called "Sharon Heights".

In 2015, the Menlo Park Historical Association (MPHA) began a project to raise funds for and build a replica of the original Menlo Park gates. The chosen site was at 800 Alma Street in front of the Menlo Park public library. The replica was completed in 2019.  On March 17, 2019, Menlo Park Mayor Ray Mueller officially dedicated the reproduction of the Menlo Gates.

Geography
Menlo Park is long and narrow on a northeast to southwest axis. The northeast portion borders the San Francisco Bay and includes the Dumbarton Bridge that connects Menlo Park to Fremont on the east side of the bay. The city shoreline includes the city's largest park, Bedwell Bayfront Park and the Don Edwards San Francisco Bay National Wildlife Refuge. San Francisquito Creek marks much of the southeast border of the city. West Menlo Park (not part of the city despite its name) along Alameda de las Pulgas nearly separates the southwestern part of the city (known as Sharon Heights) from the rest. The extreme southwest is clipped by Interstate 280.

The Bayshore Freeway (part of U.S. Route 101)  traverses Menlo Park northwest to southeast near the shoreline and somewhat parallel to the Bayshore Freeway to the southwest is El Camino Real. The intersection of El Camino Real and  Santa Cruz Avenue is considered the heart of the city. Nearby, the Menlo Park Civic Center is bounded by Ravenswood Avenue, Alma Street, Laurel Street, and Burgess Drive. It contains the council offices, library, police station, and Burgess Park, which has various recreational facilities. Other major roads include Sand Hill Road in the Sharon Heights area.

The residential areas of Menlo Park can be unofficially divided into several neighborhoods. From "east" (northeast toward San Francisco Bay) to "west" (southwest toward the Pacific Coast), they are defined by the Palo Alto Weekly as: Belle Haven is the only neighborhood east of Route 101; much of the rest of that area is business or protected land.  Between 101 and the roughly parallel Middlefield Road are the neighborhoods of the Willows, Suburban Park, Lorelei Manor, Flood Triangle, Vintage Oaks, and South of Seminary (the seminary being Saint Patrick's Seminary). Between Middlefield and El Camino Real are the Caltrain track and Felton Gables, Linfield Oaks, and Park Forest. West of El Camino until the foothills of the Peninsula are the neighborhoods of Downtown Menlo Park, Central Menlo Park, and Allied Arts (sometimes also known as Stanford Park, it is named for the Allied Arts Guild in it). In the hills are Sharon Heights and Stanford Hills. Several other neighborhoods are closely associated with Menlo Park but are actually in unincorporated San Mateo county; these include Menlo Oaks and Fair Oaks (latter part of the North Fair Oaks census area) between Bayshore and Middlefield, University Heights (also known as West Menlo Park) between Sharon Heights and most of the rest of the city, and Stanford Weekend Acres, which is somewhat near Stanford Hills.

Demographics

2010
The 2010 United States Census reported that Menlo Park had a population of 32,026. The racial makeup of Menlo Park was 22,494 (70.2%) White, 1,551 (4.8%) African American, 156 (0.5%) Native American, 3,157 (9.9%) Asian, 454 (1.4%) Pacific Islander, 2,776 (8.7%) from other races, and 1,438 (4.5%) from two or more races. Hispanics or Latinos of any race were 18.4% of the population, most of whom (4,303) were of Mexican ancestry.

The Census reported that 31,181 people (97.4% of the population) lived in households, 599 (1.9%) lived in noninstitutionalized group quarters, and 246 (0.8%) were institutionalized.

Of the 12,347 households, 33.3% had children under the age of 18 living in them, 49.9% were opposite-sex married couples living together, 8.4%had a female householder with no husband present, and 3.0% had a male householder with no wife present. About 5.2% were unmarried opposite-sex partnerships, and 0.8% were same-sex married couples or partnerships. About 29.7% were made up of individuals, and 11.1% had someone living alone who was 65 years of age or older. The average household size was 2.53. The average family size was 3.20.

In terms of age, 7,805 residents (24.4%) were under the age of 18, 1,817 people (5.7%) aged 18 to 24, 9,563 people (29.9%) aged 25 to 44, 8,263 people (25.8%) aged 45 to 64, and 4,578 people (14.3%)  were 65 years of age or older. The median age was 38.7 years. For every 100 females, there were 93.7 males. For every 100 females age 18 and over, there were 91.5 males.

The 13,085 housing units averaged 1,336.6 per square mile (516.1/km2), of which 6,927 (56.1%) were owner-occupied, and 5,420 (43.9%) were occupied by renters. The homeowner vacancy rate was 1.1%; the rental vacancy rate was 5.2%; 18,972 people (59.2% of the population) lived in owner-occupied housing units and 12,209 people (38.1%) lived in rental housing units.

2000
As of the census of 2009, there were 33,690 people, 12,543 households, and 7,248 families residing in the city.

There were 12,543 households, out of which 25.8% had children under the age of 18 living with them, 41.5% were married couples living together, 10.8% had a female householder with no husband present, and 45.67% were non-families. 35.1% of all households were made up of individuals, and 11.1% had someone living alone who was 65 years of age or older. The average household size was 2.46 and the average family size was 3.15.

In the city, the population was spread out, with 25.8% under the age of 18, 9.1% from 18 to 24, 31.5% from 25 to 44, 20.4% from 45 to 64, and 14.2% who were 65 years of age or older. The median age was 32 years. For every 100 females, there were 94.0 males. For every 100 females age 18 and over, there were 90.6 males.

As of the 2000 estimate census, the median income for a household in the city was $82,609. Males had a median income of $77,766 versus $59,101 for females. The per capita income for the city was $51,341.  About 5.9% of families and 7.3% of the population were below the poverty line, including 9.8% of those under age 18 and 8.7% of those over age 64. As of 2009 the median income for a family was $123,251.

Government and politics
City Council members are elected in districts to staggered four-year terms, in nonpartisan municipal elections every two years.

County, state and federal representation
On the San Mateo County Board of Supervisors, Menlo Park is split between Supervisorial District 3 (west of El Camino Real) and Supervisorial District 4 (east of El Camino Real), currently represented by Don Horsley and Warren Slocum, respectively.

According to the California Secretary of State, as of February 10, 2019, Menlo Park has 19,339 registered voters—9,984 (51.6%) of whom are registered Democrats, 2,989 (15.5%) registered Republicans, and 5,683 (29.4%) undeclared.

Education
For primary schools, the central portions of Menlo Park are served by the Menlo Park City School District, while the Belle Haven neighborhood and VA hospital are served by the Ravenswood City School District, and the Sharon Heights and Stanford Hills neighborhoods served by the Las Lomitas Elementary School District. For high school, Menlo Park is part of the Sequoia Union High School District, with all of the city falling into the boundaries of Menlo-Atherton High School or TIDE Academy, a small high school established in 2019.

Private elementary schools include two Catholic parochial schools, St. Raymond Catholic Elementary School and Nativity Elementary School; the Episcopalian Trinity School; Phillips Brooks School, pre-kindergarten to 5th grade; and Peninsula School, from kindergarten to 8th grade;

The Willows Campus of the private K–12 Silicon Valley International School, formerly known as German-American International School and Alto International School, is also in the city. Menlo School, a private middle and high school, is in Atherton on the border with Menlo Park.

For higher education, Saint Patrick's Seminary and University is a Catholic seminary in Menlo Park.

There are two libraries, the Main branch and the Belle Haven branch. As part of the Peninsula Library System, they share many resources with other nearby libraries.

Economy

Much of Menlo Park's economy revolves around the companies on Sand Hill Road, consisting of venture capital, private equity, financial services, law firms, and other professional service companies and investment vehicles focusing on technology. Geron, Katerra, Robert Half International, Exponent, and SRI International are among the companies based in Menlo Park. Meta Platforms moved its headquarters to the former campus of Sun Microsystems in Menlo Park in December 2011.

Top employers
In 2012, Meta (then known as Facebook) announced it would be Menlo Park's biggest employer, with 6,600 employees. According to the city's 2021 Comprehensive Annual Financial Report, the city's top employers were:

Transportation 
El Camino Real runs as the "Main Street" within Menlo Park, running concurrently with California State Route 82. The city is also the western end of the Dumbarton Bridge, which connects Menlo Park with the East Bay city of Fremont; the Menlo Park end is located immediately adjacent to Meta Platforms' headquarters. The city is flanked by U.S. Route 101 on its eastern end and by Interstate 280 on its western end.

Menlo Park's transit is primarily served by its eponymous train station, served by Caltrain. samTrans is the primary provider of bus transport throughout the city. Menlo Park's eastern ends were previously considered for a short-lived BART extension along the Bayshore Freeway. 

BART and Caltrain are also the primary transit modes for Menlo Park's connections to the San Francisco Bay Area's airports. Menlo Park is located about halfway between San Francisco International Airport and San Jose International Airport; the former can be accesed by using Caltrain and either BART's red line, or yellow line during 3-line service, or samTrans route 292 (both connecting to Caltrain at Millbrae station), while the latter connects to Menlo Park through Caltrain and VTA services through a transfer at Diridon station. Drivers to and from Menlo Park can connect to both San Jose and San Francisco airports through using US 101. Oakland Airport is the farthest of the three major Bay Area airports from Menlo Park, with drivers having to cross the Bay through one of the three bridges across it, and transit users needing to use either the Dumbarton Express, samTrans, or Caltrain to connect to BART services.

Notable people

 Joan Baez, folk singer
 Anthony Bajada, inventor of the “stay tab” press-to-open lid mechanism for drink cans
 Isaac Baron, professional poker player
 Lindsey Buckingham, musician
 Henry Cowell, composer
 Brandon Crawford, San Francisco Giants shortstop
 Abby Dahlkemper, Professional soccer player, 2019 World Cup champion with USWNT
 Tierna Davidson, professional soccer player, 2019 World Cup champion with USWNT
 Marion Dorn, textile designer
 Steve Duda, musician and DJ
 Jeanne DuPrau, author
 David Eagleman, neuroscientist and author
 Nancy Farmer, author
 Paul Goldstein (born 1976), tennis player and coach
 Ari Greenberg (born 1981), world junior contract bridge champion
 Vince Guaraldi, jazz musician known for composing music for the Peanuts animated specials
 Chris Gulker, photographer, writer
 Jack Herrick, founder of wikiHow
 Jon Huntsman, Jr., former Utah governor
 Edward Michael Keating (1925–2003), magazine publisher, journalist, author, lawyer; founder of Ramparts, member of the New Left movement.
 Ken Kesey, author
 William R. Larson, founder of Round Table Pizza
 Milton Latham, railroad baron and politician
 Josie Maran (born 1978), supermodel
 Abraham Maslow, co-founder of Humanistic Psychology
 Bob Melvin (born 1961), Major League Baseball player and manager
 Fred Moore, political activist
 John Naber, Olympic swimmer
 Stevie Nicks, musician
 Elizabeth Osborn, equestrian vaulter
 Robert Rich, musician
 Ariel Rittenhouse, Olympic diver
 Secondhand Serenade, rock band founded in Menlo Park
 Ram Shriram, founding investor of Google
 Courtney Thorne-Smith, actress
 Thorstein Veblen, sociologist known for "Theory of the Leisure Class"
 John Vesely, musician/songwriter
 Bob Weir, founding member of The Grateful Dead
 Billy Ray White, first African-American mayor of Menlo Park
 Marco Zappacosta, co-founder of Thumbtack

Sister cities 
  Bizen, Japan
  Galway, Ireland
  Kochi, India

See also

Holy Cross Cemetery (Menlo Park, California) 
Menlo Park, New Jersey
Menlo Park (Pretoria, South Africa)
The Almanac (Menlo Park)
Ravenswood Post (Menlo Park, California)

References

Notes

 Stanger, Frank M. South from San Francisco: The Life Story of San Mateo County 1963, publisher: San Mateo County Historical Association

External links

City of Menlo Park official website
Menlo Park Chamber of Commerce
Menlo Park Library
Menlo Park Historical Association

 
1927 establishments in California
Cities in San Mateo County, California
Cities in the San Francisco Bay Area
Incorporated cities and towns in California
Life sciences industry
Populated coastal places in California
Populated places established in 1927
Silicon Valley